Watson is a patronymic surname of English and Scottish origin. It means "son of Walter": the popular Old English given names "Wat" or "Watt" were diminutive forms of the name "Walter". In 2015, Watson was the 46th most common surname in England and the 19th most common in Scotland.

A 
Aaron Watson (born 1977), American singer
Adam Watson (1914–2007), British international relations theorist and researcher
Adam Watson (scientist) (1930–2019), Scottish scientist
A. J. Watson (1924–2014), American automotive engineer
Alana Watson, English musician
Albert Watson (disambiguation), multiple people
Alberta Watson (1955–2015), Canadian actress
Alex Watson (disambiguation), multiple people
Alexander Watson (disambiguation), multiple people
Allen Watson (born 1970), American baseball player
Alonzo Watson (1893–1937), African American Communist; died in the Spanish Civil War
Andrew Watson (disambiguation), multiple people
Andy Watson (disambiguation), multiple people
Angela Watson (born 1975), American actress
Anthony Watson (disambiguation), multiple people
Art Watson (1884–1950), American baseball catcher
Arthur Watson (disambiguation), multiple people
Austin Watson (born 1986), American professional wrestler better known as Xavier Woods or Consequences Creed
Austin Watson (born 1992), American ice hockey player

B 
B. B. Watson (1953–2013), American country music singer
Barrington Watson (1931–2016), Jamaican painter
Barry Watson (disambiguation), multiple people
Ben Watson (disambiguation), multiple people
Brad Watson (disambiguation), multiple people
Brandon Watson (American football) (born 1995), American football player
Brook Watson (1735–1807), British merchant, soldier, and Lord Mayor of London
Bruce Watson (disambiguation), multiple people
Bryan Watson (disambiguation), multiple people
Bubba Watson (born 1978), American golfer

C 
Carol Stuart Watson (1931–1986), American illustrator and publisher
Cecelia Watson (fl. 2010s–2020s), American author and historian
 Chandra Watson (born 1975) of The Watson Twins, American singer
Charles Watson (disambiguation), multiple people
Chris Watson (disambiguation), multiple people
Christian Watson (born 1999), American football player
Clarence Wayland Watson (1864–1940), United States Senator and coal company executive
Cliff Watson, English rugby league footballer who played in the 1960s and 1970s for Great Britain, St Helens, and Cronulla-Sutherland
Cliff Watson (speedway rider), motorcycle speedway rider of the 1940s and 1950s
 Clifford Watson, ice hockey player of the 2010s for the Sioux City Musketeers and the San Jose Sharks
Clifford Watson, rugby league footballer who played in the 1960s and 1970s for Keighley and Hunslet
Colin Watson (disambiguation), multiple people
Craig Watson (disambiguation), multiple people

D 
David Watson (disambiguation), multiple people
Debbie Watson (disambiguation), multiple people
Dennis Wallace Watson (1914–2008), Canadian-American microbiologist
Deshaun Watson (born 1995), American football player
Doc Watson (1923–2012), American musician
Don Watson, Australian author
Donald Watson, pioneer vegan

E 
E. L. Grant Watson (1885–1970), writer, anthropologist and biologist
Earl Watson (born 1979), American basketball player and coach
Ed Watson (disambiguation), multiple people
Edith Watson (1861–1943), Canadian photographer
Edith Watson (police officer) (1888–1966), British suffragist and police officer
Edward Watson (disambiguation), multiple people
Elizabeth Watson (disambiguation), multiple people
Ellen Watson (1861–1889), American pioneer of Wyoming
Emily Watson (born 1967), English actress
Emma Watson (born 1990), English actress and activist
Eric Watson (disambiguation), multiple people
Eva Auld Watson (died 1948), American artist

F 
Floyd R. Watson (1872–1974), American physicist and acoustician
Frank Watson (disambiguation), multiple people
Fred Watson (born 1944), British astronomer
Fred Watson (Australian footballer) (1882–1968), Australian rules footballer
Fred Watson (Scottish footballer), Scottish footballer

G 
G. N. Watson, English mathematician
Gary Watson (born 1930), British actor
Gary Watson (cricketer) (born 1944), South African cricketer
George Watson (disambiguation), multiple people
Graeme Watson (disambiguation), multiple people
Gregory Watson, reviver of the Twenty-seventh Amendment to the United States Constitution

H 
Hamish Watson (rugby union) (born 1991), Scottish rugby union player
Hannah Bunce Watson (1749–1807), American newspaper publisher
Harold Watson (disambiguation), multiple people
Harry Watson (disambiguation), multiple people
Heather Watson (born 1992), British tennis player
Helen Watson (disambiguation), multiple people
Henry Watson (disambiguation), multiple people
Homer Watson (1855–1936), Canadian landscape painter

I 
Ian Watson (disambiguation), multiple people
Indica Watson, English actress

J 
Jack Watson (disambiguation), multiple people
James Watson (disambiguation), multiple people
Jamie Watson (disambiguation), multiple people
Jasmine Watson, New Zealand artist
Jaylen Watson (born 1998), American football player
Jeffrey Watson (disambiguation), multiple people
Jenny Watson (artist) (born 1951), Australian artist 
Jessica Watson (born 1993), Australian sailor
Jim Watson (disambiguation), multiple people
Joan Thelma Watson (1953–2015), Canadian French Horn musician and teacher
Jobe Watson, Australian rules footballer
John Watson (disambiguation), multiple people
Dr. John Watson (fictional character)
Jordan Watson (born 1987), English kickboxer
Joseph Watson (disambiguation), multiple people
Josh Watson (American football) (born 1996), American football player
Joshua Watson, settler
Justin Watson (wide receiver) (born 1995), American football player

K 
Kaetaeta Watson, master weaver from Kiribati
Keith Watson (disambiguation), multiple people
Kenneth Watson (disambiguation), multiple people

L 
Lachlan Watson, American actor
Larry Watson (disambiguation), multiple people
 Leigh Watson (born 1975) of The Watson Twins, American singer
Lewis Watson (disambiguation), multiple people
Liam Watson (disambiguation), multiple people
Lisa Watson (born 1969), Falkland Islands journalist
Louis H. Watson (1907–1936), American bridge player
Luman Watson (1790–1834), Cincinnati clockmaker
Lyall Watson (1935–2008), South African writer, botanist, zoologist, biologist, anthropologist and ethologist

M 
Mabel Madison Watson (1872-1952), American composer
Mark Watson (disambiguation), multiple people
 Marvin Watson (born 1976), American rapper better known by his stage name Messy Marv
 Mary Jane Watson, Spider-Man character.
Mary Spencer Watson (1913–2006), English sculptor
Matthew Watson (disambiguation), multiple people
Maureen Thelma Watson (1925–1994), Rhodesian politician
Maurice Watson (born 1993), American basketball player for Maccabi Rishon LeZion of the Israeli Basketball Premier League
Michael Watson (disambiguation), multiple people
Moray Watson (1928–2017), English actor

N 
Niall Watson (born 2000), English professional footballer
Nicholas Watson (born 1977), writer and filmmaker
Nicholas Watson (academic), English-Canadian medievalist
Nolan Watson (born 1979), Canadian businessman and philanthropist

P 
Patrick Watson (disambiguation), multiple people
Paul Watson (disambiguation), multiple people
Paula Watson (1927–2003), American singer
Percival Watson (1881–1959), Congregationalist minister in South Australia and Queensland
Peter Watson (disambiguation), multiple people
Peyton Watson (born 2002), American basketball player
Phebe Watson (1876–1964), South Australian educator and union activist

R 
Ralph Watson (1936–2021), English actor
Raymond Watson (disambiguation), multiple people
 Reatha Dale Watson, birth name of Barbara La Marr, American actress
Rebecca Watson, a skeptical blogger and podcast host who founded the Skepchick blog
Reg Watson, Australian television producer
Regina Watson (1845-1913) German-American composer, pianist and teacher
Richard Watson (disambiguation), multiple people
Robert Watson (disambiguation), multiple people
Rodney Watson, American basketball coach
Rory Watson (born 1996), English footballer
Russell Watson, English tenor
Ruth Watson, English hotelier, broadcaster and food writer
Ruth Watson, New Zealand artist
Ryan Watson (disambiguation), multiple people

S 
Sam Watson (disambiguation), multiple people
Scott Watson, New Zealander convicted of murder
Sereno Watson, American botanist
Shane Watson, Australian cricketer
Shayne Watson (born 1982), Australian professional baseball player, coach
Sheila Watson (disambiguation), multiple people
Steve Watson (disambiguation), multiple people
Summer Watson, singer
Susan Kelechi Watson, American Actress of Jamaican parents
Sydney Watson (1903–1991), English church musician

T 
Terrell Watson (born 1993), American football player
Terrence Watson (born 1987), American-Israeli basketball player 
Thomas Watson (disambiguation), multiple people
Tim Watson, Australian rules footballer
Tom Watson (1932–2001), Scottish actor
 Toni Watson (born 2000), Australian singer known professionally as Tones and I
Travis Watson (born 1981), American professional basketball player

W 
 Walter Mother Watson (1865–1898), Major League Baseball pitcher
William Watson (disambiguation), multiple people
Wingfield W. Watson, (1828–1922), religious leader

Notes 

English-language surnames
Surnames of British Isles origin
Surnames of English origin
Surnames of Scottish origin
Scottish surnames
Patronymic surnames
Surnames from given names